This is a list of municipalities of Sweden which have standing links to local communities in other countries known as "town twinning" (usually in Europe) or "sister cities" (usually in the rest of the world).

As a sign of deteriorating relations with China, Gothenburg, Linköping, Luleå and Västerås, which have had long-standing twinning or partnership agreements with Chinese cities – Shanghai, Guangzhou, Xian and Jinan respectively – have allowed the agreements to lapse in 2020. Linköping mayor Lars Vikinge told that they were terminating all political contact with China because of the unacceptable Chinese hostility towards the Swedish government.

A
Alingsås

 Kartung, Gambia
 Mont-de-Marsan, France
 Ocotal, Nicaragua
 Lillestrøm, Norway
 Tårnby, Denmark

Älmhult

 Kuršėnai, Lithuania
 Time, Norway

Alvesta

 Krasnystaw, Poland
 Lengede, Germany
 Turnov, Czech Republic

Älvsbyn

 Fauske, Norway
 Haapavesi, Finland
 Monchegorsk, Russia

Åmål

 De Pere, United States
 Frogn, Norway
 Gadebusch, Germany
  Kubrat, Bulgaria
 Türi, Estonia

Ängelholm

 Dobele, Latvia
 Høje-Taastrup, Denmark
 Kamen, Germany

Årjäng

 Fanø, Denmark

 Vastseliina (Võru Parish), Estonia

Arjeplog

 Salla, FInland
 Umba, Russia

Arvika

 Kongsvinger, Norway
 Skive, Denmark
 Ylöjärvi, Finland

Askersund

 Eura, Finland
 Jordanów, Poland

B
Bengtsfors
 Wuzhou, China

Berg
 Berg, Germany

Bjurholm

 Bardu, Norway
 Fara Novarese, Italy
 Ii, Finland

Boden

 Alta, Norway
 Apatity, Russia

 Oulu, Finland

Bollnäs

 Flekkefjord, Norway
 Misburg-Anderten (Hanover), Germany
 Ogre, Latvia
 Shepton Mallet, England, United Kingdom

Borås

 Espelkamp, Germany
 Mikkeli, Finland
 Molde, Norway
 Vejle, Denmark

Borgholm

 Korsnäs, Finland
 Łeba, Poland
 Rockford, United States

Borlänge

 Chişinău, Moldova
 Frederikshavn, Denmark
 Larvik, Norway
 Pitești, Romania
 Vestmannaeyjar, Iceland

Botkyrka

 Alytus, Lithuania
 Brøndby, Denmark
 Stange, Norway

Burlöv
 Anklam, Germany

D
Dals-Ed
 Cepoy, France

Danderyd
 Kauniainen, Finland

E
Ekerö
 Otepää, Estonia

Emmaboda

 Bartoszyce, Poland
 Jeppo (Nykarleby), Finland
 Jyderup (Holbæk), Denmark
 Kvam, Norway
 Lefkada, Greece

Enköping

 Kaarina, Finland
 Nedre Eiker, Norway
 Ølstykke (Egedal), Denmark

Eskilstuna

 Bridgeton, United States
 Erlangen, Germany
 Esbjerg, Denmark
 Fjarðabyggð, Iceland
 Haapsalu, Estonia
 Jūrmala, Latvia
 Jyväskylä, Finland
 Luton, England, United Kingdom

 Stavanger, Norway
 Usangi, Tanzania

Eslöv

 Asker, Norway
 Garðabær, Iceland
 Jakobstad, Finland
 Rudersdal, Denmark
 Viljandi, Estonia

F
Falköping

 Fontanellato, Italy
 Kokemäki, Finland
 Lier, Norway
 Mariagerfjord, Denmark

Falun

 Grudziądz, Poland
 Gütersloh, Germany
 Hamina, Finland
 Røros, Norway
 Vordingborg, Denmark

Finspång

 Finsterwalde, Germany
 Joutsa, Finland
 Givet, France
 Salaspils, Latvia
 Stromberg, Germany
 Yvoir, Belgium

Forshaga

 Klützer Winkel, Germany
 Råde, Norway

G
Gällivare

 Barga, Italy
 Kirovsk, Russia
 Kittilä, Finland

Gävle

 Galva, United States
 Gjøvik, Norway
 Jūrmala, Latvia
 Næstved, Denmark
 Rauma, Finland

Gnosjö
 Białogard, Poland

Götene
 Pasvalys, Lithuania

Gothenburg

 Aarhus, Denmark
 Bergen, Norway
 Chicago, United States
 Kraków, Poland
 Lyon, France
 Nelson Mandela Bay, South Africa
 Rostock, Germany
 Turku, Finland

Gotland

 Gammalsvenskby (Zmiivka), Ukraine
 Kragerø, Norway
 Lübeck, Germany
 Mariehamn, Åland Islands, Finland
 Rhodes, Greece
 Saaremaa, Estonia
 Samsø, Denmark
 Soest, Germany

 Valkeakoski, Finland

H
Håbo

 Fredensborg, Denmark
 Ingå, Finland
 Nittedal, Norway
 Paide, Estonia

Hällefors

 Jelgava, Latvia
 Lüchow, Germany
 Orkland, Norway

Hallsberg

 Gifhorn, Germany
 Jajce, Bosnia and Herzegovina

Halmstad

 Gentofte, Denmark
 Hanko, Finland
 Stord, Norway

Haninge

 Formia, Italy
 Ishøj, Denmark
 Haapsalu, Estonia
 Krokom, Sweden
 Pargas, Finland

Haparanda

 Hammerfest, Norway
 Kovdor, Russia
 Širvintos, Lithuania

Härryda

 Laitila, Finland
 Võru, Estonia

Hässleholm

 Darłowo, Poland
 Eckernförde, Germany
 Nykøbing Sjælland (Odsherred), Denmark

Hedemora

 Bauska, Latvia
 Follonica, Italy
 Gera, Tanzania
 Ishozi, Tanzania
 Ishunju, Tanzania
 Khashuri, Georgia

Helsingborg

 Alexandria, United States
 Dubrovnik, Croatia

 Liepāja, Latvia
 Pärnu, Estonia

Herrljunga

 Kamianets-Podilskyi, Ukraine
 Ukmergė, Lithuania

Höganäs

 Dombóvár, Hungary
 Herlev, Denmark
 Lieto, Finland
 Nesodden, Norway
 Seltjarnarnes, Iceland
 Wittstock, Germany

Hörby

 Peja, Kosovo
 Pyrzyce, Poland

Huddinge

 Askim, Norway
 Vantaa, Finland

Hultsfred
 Rumia, Poland

Hylte

 Lihula (Lääneranna), Estonia
 Piecki, Poland

J
Jönköping

 Bodø, Norway
 Kuopio, Finland
 Lääne-Viru County, Estonia
 Svendborg, Denmark
 Tianjin, China

K
Kalmar

 Árborg, Iceland
 Arendal, Norway
 Entebbe, Uganda
 Gdańsk, Poland

 Panevėžys, Lithuania
 Savonlinna, Finland
 Wilmington, United States
 Wismar, Germany

Karlshamn

 Heinola, Finland
 Sopot, Poland
 Stade, Germany

Karlskoga

 Aalborg, Denmark
 Fredrikstad, Norway
 Narva, Estonia
 Norðurþing, Iceland
 Olaine, Latvia
 Riihimäki, Finland
 Sanremo, Italy
 Wheaton, United States

Karlskrona

 Aizpute, Latvia
 Gdynia, Poland
 Hillerød, Denmark
 Horten, Norway
 Klaipėda, Lithuania
 Loviisa, Finland
 Ólafsfjörður, Iceland

Karlstad

 Blönduós, Iceland
 Gaziantep, Turkey
 Horsens, Denmark
 Jõgeva, Estonia

 Moss, Norway
 Nokia, Finland

Kävlinge
 Nowogard, Poland

Kil

 Laihia, Finland
 Trysil, Norway

Kinda
 Amata, Latvia

Kiruna

 Narvik, Norway
 Rovaniemi, Finland
 Rustavi, Georgia

Klippan

 Akaa, Finland
 Limbaži, Latvia
 Sande, Norway

Knivsta
 Jomala, Åland Islands, Finland

Kristianstad

 Budafok-Tétény (Budapest), Hungary
 Espoo, Finland

 Køge, Denmark
 Kongsberg, Norway

 Rendsburg, Germany

 Skagafjörður, Iceland

Kumla

 Aurskog-Høland, Norway
 Frederikssund, Denmark
 Sipoo, Finland

Kungälv

 Hiddenhausen, Germany
 Perano, Italy

Kungsbacka

 Saarijärvi, Finland
 Šternberk, Czech Republic

L
Laholm

 Amber Valley, England, United Kingdom
 Głogów, Poland
 Møn (Vordingborg), Denmark
 Nurmes, Finland
 Volda, Norway

Landskrona

 Glostrup, Denmark
 Kotka, Finland
 Plochingen, Germany
 Võru, Estonia

Lekeberg
 Dundaga, Latvia

Leksand

 Aurora, Canada
 Brainerd, United States
 Hørsholm, Denmark
 Karksi-Nuia (Mulgi), Estonia
 Lillehammer, Norway
 Oulainen, Finland
 Tōbetsu, Japan

Lerum

 Aalborg, Denmark
 Ķekava, Latvia
 Vihanti (Raahe), Finland

Lidingö

 Lohja, Finland
 Saldus, Latvia

Lidköping

 Kecskemét, Hungary
 Utena, Lithuania

Lilla Edet

 Nome, Norway
 Nurmijärvi, Finland

Lindesberg

 Haßberge (district), Germany
 Jammerbugt, Denmark
 Oppdal, Norway

Linköping

 Ísafjarðarbær, Iceland
 Joensuu, Finland
 Kaunas, Lithuania
 Linz, Austria
 Macau, China
 Palo Alto, United States

 Tønsberg, Norway

Ljungby

 Ås, Norway
 Paimio, Finland
 Šilutė, Lithuania

Ljusdal

 Assens, Denmark
 Ikaalinen, Finland
 Schlieben, Germany
 Vinni, Estonia

Ludvika

 Bad Honnef, Germany
 Imatra, Finland

Luleå

 Kemi, Finland
 Puerto Cabezas, Nicaragua
 Santa Lucía de Tirajana, Spain
 Tromsø, Norway
 Zenica, Bosnia and Herzegovina

Lund

 Dalvíkurbyggð, Iceland
 Greifswald, Germany
 Hamar, Norway
 León, Nicaragua
 Nevers, France
 Porvoo, Finland
 Viborg, Denmark
 Zabrze, Poland

Lycksele

 Ähtäri, Finland

 Paltamo, Finland
 Vefsn, Norway

M
Malmö

 Port Adelaide Enfield, Australia
 Stralsund, Germany
 Szczecin, Poland
 Tallinn, Estonia
 Tangshan, China
 Vaasa, Finland
 Varna, Bulgaria

Mariestad
 Pakruojis, Lithuania

Mark

 Apolda, Germany
 Ontinyent, Spain
 Szamotuły, Poland

Markaryd

 Bytów, Poland
 Pälkäne, Finland
 Vestre Toten, Norway

Mjölby

 Häädemeeste, Estonia
 Hankasalmi, Finland
 Karmøy, Norway

Mölndal

 Albertslund, Denmark
 Borken, Germany
 Canterbury, England, United Kingdom
 Dainville, France
 Grabow, Germany
 Říčany, Czech Republic
 Whitstable, England, United Kingdom

Mora

 Mora, United States
 Oberammergau, Germany
 Val di Fiemme District, Italy
 Vörå, Finland

Motala

 Daugavpils, Latvia
 Hyvinkää, Finland

Munkedal
 Neuenkirchen, Germany

N
Nässjö

 Brønderslev, Denmark
 Eidsberg, Norway

Nora

 Fladungen, Germany
 Hône, Italy
 Põhja-Sakala, Estonia

Nordmaling

 Sint-Genesius-Rode, Belgium
 Suomussalmi, Finland

Norrköping

 Esslingen am Neckar, Germany
 Klaksvík, Faroe Islands
 Kópavogur, Iceland
 Linz, Austria
 Odense, Denmark
 Riga, Latvia
 Tampere, Finland
 Trondheim, Norway

Norrtälje

 Hiiumaa, Estonia
 Paldiski (Lääne-Harju), Estonia

 Rūjiena (Valmiera), Latvia
 Sel, Norway
 Sicaya, Bolivia
 Vihti, Finland

Nynäshamn

 Kimitoön, Finland
 Kalundborg, Denmark
 Liepāja, Latvia
 Lillesand, Norway

O
Ockelbo is a member of the Charter of European Rural Communities, a town twinning association across the European Union. Ockelbo also has one other twin town.

Charter of European Rural Communities
 Bienvenida, Spain
 Bièvre, Belgium
 Bucine, Italy
 Cashel, Ireland
 Cissé, France
 Desborough, England, United Kingdom
 Esch (Haaren), Netherlands
 Hepstedt, Germany
 Ibănești, Romania
 Kandava (Tukums), Latvia
 Kannus, Finland
 Kolindros, Greece
 Lassee, Austria
 Medzev, Slovakia
 Moravče, Slovenia
 Næstved, Denmark
 Nagycenk, Hungary
 Nadur, Malta
 Pano Lefkara, Cyprus
 Põlva, Estonia
 Samuel (Soure), Portugal
 Slivo Pole, Bulgaria
 Starý Poddvorov, Czech Republic
 Strzyżów, Poland
 Tisno, Croatia
 Troisvierges, Luxembourg
 Žagarė (Joniškis), Lithuania
Other
 Stromsburg, United States

Olofström
 Kwidzyn, Poland

Örebro

 Drammen, Norway
 Kolding, Denmark
 Lappeenranta, Finland
 Stykkishólmur, Iceland

Örnsköldsvik

 Äänekoski, Finland
 Hveragerði, Iceland
 Ikast-Brande, Denmark
 Sigdal, Norway
 Tarp, Germany

Orust

 Aalborg, Denmark
 Teuva, Finland

Osby

 Gribskov, Denmark
 Kretinga, Lithuania

Oskarshamn

 Korsholm, Finland
 Mandal, Norway
 Middelfart, Denmark
 Pärnu, Estonia
 Ray Nkonyeni, South Africa

Östersund

 Kajaani, Finland
 Odense, Denmark
 Sanok, Poland

Östhammar

 Durbuy, Belgium
 Kościelisko, Poland
 Orimattila, Finland
 Poti, Georgia
 Tvrdošín, Slovakia
 Valga, Estonia
 Valka, Latvia

Östra Göinge

 Kelmė, Lithuania
 Laukaa, Finland
 Modum, Norway
 Stevns, Denmark

Oxelösund is a member of the Douzelage, a town twinning association of towns across the European Union. Oxelösund also has one other twin town.

Douzelage
 Agros, Cyprus
 Altea, Spain
 Asikkala, Finland
 Bad Kötzting, Germany
 Bellagio, Italy
 Bundoran, Ireland
 Chojna, Poland
 Granville, France
 Holstebro, Denmark
 Houffalize, Belgium
 Judenburg, Austria
 Kőszeg, Hungary
 Marsaskala, Malta
 Meerssen, Netherlands
 Niederanven, Luxembourg
 Preveza, Greece
 Rokiškis, Lithuania
 Rovinj, Croatia
 Sesimbra, Portugal
 Sherborne, England, United Kingdom
 Sigulda, Latvia
 Siret, Romania
 Škofja Loka, Slovenia
 Sušice, Czech Republic
 Tryavna, Bulgaria
 Türi, Estonia
 Zvolen, Slovakia
Other
 Kronstadt, Russia

P
Piteå

 Grindavík, Iceland
 Kandalaksha, Russia
 Saint Barthélemy, France

R
Robertsfors

 Kuhmo, Finland
 Sørfold, Norway

Ronneby

 Bornholm, Denmark
 Elbląg, Poland
 Enfield, United States
 Gherla, Romania
 Høyanger, Norway
 Johnson City, United States
 Mänttä-Vilppula, Finland
 Schopfheim, Germany
 Steglitz-Zehlendorf (Berlin), Germany

S
Sala

 Åndalsnes (Rauma), Norway
 Kristinestad, Finland
 Pao, Chad
 Pont-Sainte-Marie, France
 Rosenholm (Syddjurs), Denmark
 Vändra (Põhja-Pärnumaa), Estonia

Sandviken

 Nakskov (Lolland), Denmark
 Rjukan, Norway
 Varkaus, Finland

Sigtuna

 Łomża, Poland
 Porsgrunn, Norway
 Raisio, Finland
 Rakvere, Estonia

Simrishamn

 Barth, Germany
 Bornholm, Denmark
 Kołobrzeg, Poland
 Palanga, Lithuania

Sjöbo

 Teterow, Germany
 Trzebiatów, Poland

Skara

 Eidsvoll, Norway
 Fljótsdalshérað, Iceland
 Radviliškis, Lithuania
 Sorø, Denmark
 Zeven, Germany

Skellefteå

 Pardubice, Czech Republic
 Raahe, Finland
 Rana, Norway

 Tongling, China
 Vesthimmerland, Denmark

Skövde

 Halden, Norway
 Kuressaare (Saaremaa), Estonia
 Ringsted, Denmark
 Sastamala, Finland
 Zhangjiakou, China

Skurup
 Niepars, Germany

Smedjebacken

 Petroșani, Romania
 Virolahti, Finland

Söderhamn

 Kunda (Viru-Nigula), Estonia
 Szczecinek, Poland
 Szigethalom, Hungary

Söderköping
 Talsi, Latvia

Södertälje

 Angers, France
 Forssa, Finland
 Pärnu, Estonia
 Sarpsborg, Norway
 Struer, Denmark
 Wuxi, China

Sollefteå

 Esashi, Japan
 Madison, United States
 Nykarleby, Finland
 Põltsamaa, Estonia
 Steinkjer, Norway

Sollentuna

 Hvidovre, Denmark
 Oppegård, Norway
 Saue, Estonia
 Tuusula, Finland

Solna

 Burbank, United States
 Gladsaxe, Denmark
 Pirkkala, Finland
 Ski, Norway
 Valmiera, Latvia

Sölvesborg

 Bornholm, Denmark
 Malbork, Poland
 Wolgast, Germany

Staffanstorp

 Grimmen, Germany
 Killarney, Ireland
 Kohtla-Järve, Estonia
 Ozzano dell'Emilia, Italy
 Vallensbæk, Denmark
 Viitasaari, Finland
 Wolin, Poland

Stockholm – the policy of Stockholm is to have informal town twinning with all capitals of the world, its main focus being those in northern Europe. Stockholm does not sign any formal town twinning treaties, and has only cooperation agreements on specific issues limited in time.

Storuman

 Viitasaari, Finland
 Żywiec, Poland

Strängnäs

 Kisko (Salo), Finland
 Loiborsoit (Lolkisale), Tanzania
 Muurla (Salo), Finland
 Olsztynek, Poland

 Ratzeburg, Germany
 Rheinsberg, Germany
 Ribe (Esbjerg), Denmark
 Saku, Estonia
 Sauvo, Finland
 Sogndal, Norway
 Tukums, Latvia

Strömstad
 Ledbury, England, United Kingdom

Sundbyberg

 Alūksne, Latvia
 Kirkkonummi, Finland

Surahammar

 Juupajoki, Finland

 Nore og Uvdal, Norway
 Tarvastu (Viljandi Parish), Estonia
 Wahlstedt, Germany

Svalöv

 Kalundborg, Denmark
 Kėdainiai, Lithuania
 Kyritz, Germany
 Łobez, Poland

Svedala

 Bergen auf Rügen, Germany
 Goleniów, Poland
 Ishøj, Denmark

Svenljunga

 Chizhou, China
 Rehna, Germany
 Tamsalu (Tapa), Estonia

T
Täby

 Järvenpää, Finland
 Lørenskog, Norway

 Rødovre, Denmark
 Viimsi, Estonia

Tanum

 Capo di Ponte, Italy
 Faaborg-Midtfyn, Denmark
 Hole, Norway
 Kustavi, Finland
 Strandabyggð, Iceland

Tierp

 Forssa, Finland
 Hauho (Hämeenlinna), Finland
 Janakkala, Finland

 Vågå, Norway

Tingsryd

 Keuruu, Finland
 Langeland, Denmark
 Lindström, United States
 Skaun, Norway

Töreboda
 Iecava, Latvia

Torsby

 Bømlo, Norway
 Easter Island, Chile
 Großkrotzenburg, Germany
 Pernå (Loviisa), Finland
 Rautalampi, Finland
 Ringkøbing-Skjern, Denmark

Trelleborg

 Bitola, North Macedonia
 Sassnitz, Germany
 Stralsund, Germany

Trollhättan

 Kerava, Finland
 Kristiansand, Norway
 Reykjanesbær, Iceland
 Tempe, United States

Tyresö

 Cēsis, Latvia
 Savigny-le-Temple, France

U
Uddevalla

 Jõhvi, Estonia
 Loimaa, Finland
 Mosfellsbær, Iceland
 North Ayrshire, Scotland, United Kingdom
 Okazaki, Japan
 Skien, Norway
 Thisted, Denmark

Umeå

 Harstad, Norway
 Helsingør, Denmark

 Saskatoon, Canada
 Vaasa, Finland
 Würzburg, Germany

Uppsala

 Bærum, Norway
 Daejeon, South Korea
 Frederiksberg, Denmark
 Hafnarfjörður, Iceland
 Hämeenlinna, Finland
 Minneapolis, United States
 Tartu, Estonia

V
Vadstena

 Naantali, Finland
 Nordfyn, Denmark
 Svelvik, Norway

Vänersborg

 Arsuk, Greenland
 Countryside, Åland Islands, Finland
 Eiði, Faroe Islands
 Herning, Denmark
 Holmestrand, Norway
 Husby, Germany
 Kangasala, Finland
 Lich, Germany
 Siglufjörður, Iceland

Vännäs

 Cameri, Italy
 Hemnes, Norway
 Isokyrö, Finland

Vansbro

 Kalajoki, Finland
 Velké Meziříčí, Czech Republic

Vara

 Catarroja, Spain
 Huangshan, China
 Kadaň, Czech Republic
 Mäntsälä, Finland
 Märjamaa, Estonia
 Vestby, Norway

Varberg

 Haderslev, Denmark
 Karlovy Vary, Czech Republic
 Uusikaupunki, Finland

Västerås

 Akureyri, Iceland
 Ålesund, Norway

 Kassel, Germany
 Lahti, Finland
 Randers, Denmark

Västervik

 Akranes, Iceland
 Bamble, Norway
 Närpes, Finland
 Tønder, Denmark
 Ventspils, Latvia

Växjö

 Almere, Netherlands
 Duluth, United States
 Kaunas, Lithuania
 Lancaster, England, United Kingdom
 Lohja, Finland
 Pobiedziska, Poland
 Ringerike, Norway
 Schwerin, Germany
 Skagaströnd, Iceland

Vimmerby

 Joniškis, Lithuania
 Kauhava, Finland
 Mukono Town, Uganda
 Rygge, Norway
 Skærbæk (Tønder), Denmark
 Þorlákshöfn, Iceland

Vingåker

 Kiikala (Salo), Finland
 Måsøy, Norway
 Mühltal, Germany
 Pühalepa (Hiiumaa), Estonia

References

Sweden
Lists of populated places in Sweden
Foreign relations of Sweden

Sweden geography-related lists